Scott Bailey (born March 12, 1970) is a Canadian curler. He is best known however for being the long-time lead for Wayne Middaugh. It was with Middaugh that Bailey won the 1998 Ford World Curling Championships.

Bailey was a member of the Middaugh rink from 1994 to 2010, when Middaugh left the Russ Howard rink.  During this period, the Middaugh rink won three provincial championships (1998, 2001 and 2005), in addition to winning the 1998 Labatt Brier and 1998 World Championships.

Bailey played for the John Epping rink from 2010 to 2014. He currently skips his own rink, reaching the Ontario Tankard provincials in 2016 and 2017.

Personal life
Outside of curling, Bailey owns Bailey Contracting. He is married and has three children and resides in Brampton.

References

External links
 

1970 births
Brier champions
Curlers from Ontario
Living people
Sportspeople from Brampton
World curling champions
Canadian male curlers
Canada Cup (curling) participants